Slate Hill may refer to the following places in the United States:

 Slate Hill, New York, a hamlet of Wawayanda, New York
 Slate Hill, Virginia, an unincorporated community in Buckingham County, Virginia

See also 
 Slate Hill Cemetery, an historic cemetery in Morrisville, Pennsylvania
 Slate Hill Plantation, an historic plantation in Prince Edward County, Virginia